Vibrio tubiashii is a Gram-negative, rod-shaped (0.5 um-1.5 um) marine bacterium that uses a single polar flagellum for motility. It has been implicated in several diseases of marine organisms.

Discovery  
Vibrio tubiashii was originally isolated from juvenile and larval bivalve mollusks suffering from bacillary necrosis, now called vibriosis. It was originally discovered by Tubiash et al in 1965, hence the name, but not properly described until Hada et al in 1984. Since  its  discovery  and  identification,  V.  tubiashii  has  been implicated in shellfish vibriosis across the globe, and more recently, coral diseases.

Pathogenicity 
Like many Vibrio spp., V. tubiashii produces extracellular enzymes, specifically a zinc-metalloprotease and a cytolysin/hemolysin that are nearly identical to those produced by other pathogenic Vibrio strains. This being said, only the zinc-metalloprotease elicited disease symptoms in Crassostrea gigas  consistent with vibriosis. In addition to shellfish disease, Vibrio-derived zinc-metalloprotease could be an integral virulence factor in diseases of scleractinian corals as it was shown to cause photoinactivation of the coral endosymbiont Symbiodinium, leading to tissue color loss and eventual tissue death.

The hemolytic activity of V. tubiashii cultures increases during early growth stages and progressively decreases throughout the stationary phase, while proteolytic activity shows a gradual increase starting in the early stationary phase, suggesting that pathogenesis in this organism requires higher cell density.

References

External links
Type strain of Vibrio tubiashii at BacDive -  the Bacterial Diversity Metadatabase	

Bacterial diseases
Vibrionales
Waterborne diseases
Marine microorganisms